In the Mountains of Virginia is a 1913 American silent short drama film directed by G.P. Hamilton starring Harry Van Meter, Jacques Jaccard, Louise Lester, Charles Morrison, Jack Richardson, and Vivian Rich.

External links

1913 films
1913 drama films
Silent American drama films
American silent short films
American black-and-white films
1913 short films
1910s American films
1910s English-language films
American drama short films